Stanton Bliss Priddy (February 26, 1921 – May 12, 1996) is an American ice hockey defenseman who competed in ice hockey at the 1948 Winter Olympics.

Priddy was a member of the American ice hockey team which played eight games, but was disqualified, at the 1948 Winter Olympics hosted by St. Moritz, Switzerland.

References

External links

1921 births
1996 deaths
American men's ice hockey defensemen
Ice hockey players from Massachusetts
Ice hockey players at the 1948 Winter Olympics
Olympic ice hockey players of the United States
Sportspeople from Brookline, Massachusetts